La matiouette ou l'arrière-pays (also known as La matiouette) is a 1983 French 48-minute drama film directed by André Téchiné. It was screened in the Un Certain Regard section at the 1983 Cannes Film Festival.

Cast
 Jacques Nolot as Alain Pruez
 Patrick Fierry as Jacky Verrière

References

External links

1983 films
French drama films
1980s French-language films
1983 drama films
French black-and-white films
Films directed by André Téchiné
1980s French films